Elections were held in Cagayan Valley for seats in the House of Representatives of the Philippines on May 9, 2016.

The candidate with the most votes won that district's seat for the 17th Congress of the Philippines.

Summary

Batanes
Henedina Abad is the incumbent.

Cagayan

1st District
Incumbent Salvacion Ponce Enrile is not running. Her husband former Representative Jack Enrile is her party's nominee.

2nd District
Baby Aline Vargas-Alfonso is the incumbent.

3rd District
Randolph Ting is the incumbent.

Isabela

1st District
Incumbent Rodolfo Albano III is running.

2nd District
Ana Cristina Go is the incumbent. She changed her party affiliation from Nacionalista to Liberal.

3rd District
Napoleon Dy is the incumbent and is running unopposed.

4th District
Giorgidi Aggabao is term limited.

Nueva Vizcaya
Incumbent Carlos M. Padilla is term-limited and is running for Governor. His wife, incumbent Governor Ruth Padilla is his party's nominee.

Quirino
Incumbent Dakila Carlo Cua is running unopposed.

References

External links
Official COMELEC results 2016

2016 Philippine general election
Lower house elections in the Cagayan Valley